The Morgue is an upcoming Indian Malayalam-language thriller film directed by debutant duo Mahezh & Sukesh for producers Sandeep Sreedharan and Sreerekhaa, starring Bigg Boss (Malayalam season 2) fame Pavan Gino Thomas in the lead role, along with a host of newcomers. The film began its principal photography on 13 October 2020 and was shot at Chitranjali Studio and several locations of Kerala.

Summary 
The Morgue tells the story that starts with a DJ party around 7 pm and the ensuing events result in several characters ending up in a morgue.

Cast 
 
Pavan Gino Thomas - Jose
Muhammed Sharick
Kannan Nayar
VK Baiju
Aarathi Krishna
Akshara Krishna
Deepu Uday
Ravi Shankar
Vishnu Priyan
Ambu Yogeendran
Ajesh 
Viji Unnikrishnan
Ajith 
Amal MK
Arun J H
Akash Vijayakumar

Production
Film maker Sandeep Sreedharan and Sreerekhaa decided to bank roll the film helmed by first time director duo Mahezh and Sukesh. under their banner A World Apart Cinemas. Model as well as former Bigg Boss Malayalam contestant Pavan Gino Thomas was signed to play the lead role with Shariq Mohammed, a social media influencer and actress Arathi Krishna in supporting roles. Sound designer VK Rajan, who worked in KGF and composer Emil Mohammed were also signed for the film. Most of the film was shot at Chitranjali Studio due to COVID-19 pandemic situation and several other locations like Ponmudi, Veli Beach and Tiruvananthapuram.

See also
 Mortuary (1983)

References

External links
 

Upcoming films
Upcoming directorial debut films
Indian thriller films